Muhammad Sultan Mirza (1375 – 1403) was a member of the Timurid dynasty and a grandson of its founder, the Central Asian conqueror Timur. As Timur's favourite grandson, Muhammad Sultan served as one of his principal military commanders, helping lead forces in successful campaigns against the Golden Horde, Persian kingdoms and the Ottoman Empire. Described by the historian Arabshah as "a manifest prodigy in his noble nature and vigour", Muhammad Sultan was eventually appointed by Timur as heir-apparent to the empire. His premature death in 1403 greatly affected his grandfather.

Background
Muhammad Sultan was born in 1375, the elder son of Jahangir Mirza and the only one by his wife, the Sufi princess Khanzada Begum. His father, Timur's favourite son and original heir, died within a few months of his birth. His mother, a maternal granddaughter of Jani Beg, Khan of the Golden Horde, was subsequently remarried to Jahangir's younger brother Miran Shah.

Military career
In 1386, Timur captured Tabriz, the capital of the Jalairid Sultanate. Muhammad Sultan, then only ten years old, was appointed governor of the city. Five years later, he accompanied his grandfather in his invasion of the territory of Tokhtamysh, Khan of the Golden Horde. Initially part of the scouting parties which preceded the army, Timur later gave him command of the army centre, a position he held during the ensuing Battle of the Kondurcha River in June 1391.

In 1393, he took part in the campaign against the  Muzaffarids of Fars. He, along with his younger half-brother Pir Muhammad, were sent through Kurdistan, capturing various provinces, with orders to later re-join the main army. Timur himself pursued the Muzaffarid king, Shah Mansur. The armies of the two rulers met outside the city of Shiraz; Timur entrusted his left flank to Muhammad Sultan, the right to Pir Muhammad whilst the centre was given to their uncle Shah Rukh. The battle ultimately resulted in a Timurid victory, with Shah Mansur being killed by Timur's soldiers and his lands subsequently being incorporated into the empire.

Muhammad Sultan once more joined Timur in his war against Tokhtamysh in 1395, accompanying the emperor in a second invasion of the Golden Horde. He led the right wing of the army during the Battle of the Terek River and inflicted heavy damage on the Khan's left flank, forcing it into retreat, with Tokhtamysh himself fleeing soon after. The following year, he was dispatched to the kingdom of Hormuz on the Persian Gulf. After capturing various provincial forts, the prince compelled the ruler, Muhammad Shah, to submit.

In 1397, he was named governor of the eastern province of Ferghana. With the idea of an eventual campaign against China in mind, Timur ordered his grandson to consolidate bases in the region, as well as develop soil cultivation along the route. Muhammad Sultan was given an army of forty thousand and had a fort built in the region of Ashapara, followed by another further east by the Issyk-Kul. The prince intended to use these as a frontier line for operations against the neighbouring kingdom of Moghulistan in 1399. However, this plan was forestalled when his cousin, Iskandar Mirza, drew on Muhammad Sultan's detachments at Ashpara to launch a raid into Chinese Turkestan. This arbitrary action resulted in a grudge between the two princes. Less than a year later, after Iskandar had been transferred to Ferghana while Muhammad Sultan himself was named custodian of Samarqand, the latter had his cousin captured and detained within the city. Iskandar's atabeg and twenty-six of his nobles were executed. Reports of Timur's reaction to the feud are contradictory; one account states that Timur blamed Muhammad Sultan for the dispute and upheld Iskandar, ordering restitution for his nobles. Another says that Timur sided with the former and had Iskandar's feet whipped as punishment.

The prince supposedly pushed Timur to pursue his campaign against the Delhi Sultanate in 1398. The Malfuzat-i Timuri, an alleged autobiography of the emperor, ascribes the following speech to Muhammad Sultan:

As Timur's heir
Sometime prior to his Indian invasion, Timur had Muhammad Sultan appointed as his heir apparent. When Delhi was conquered in December 1398, Timur had the khutba read there, with the prince's name being said alongside his own. Coins were also struck with Muhammad Sultan's name and title "Vali al-lakhd" (throne-heir) following that of Timur and the puppet-Chagatai Khan. The emperor's choice in successor was mainly based on birth, rather than position or accomplishment; in addition to the prince's own exalted maternal lineage, his father Jahangir, alone of Timur's four sons, was born of a free-wife as opposed to a concubine.

In 1399, he was named governor of Turan. This was followed two years later by an appointment over the lands of the former Mongol Ilkhanate, which Timur termed "the throne of Hulagu." These lands had previously been governed by Muhammad Sultan's disgraced uncle/stepfather Miran Shah.

In 1402, Timur began military engagements in anticipation for his campaign against the Ottoman Sultan, Bayezid I. This was initiated by Muhammad Sultan, recently summoned from Samarqand, besieging and storming the fortress at Kamakh. This was a direct challenge and provocation to Bayezid, who had only recently captured the stronghold from Timur's ally, Taharten. The war culminated on 20 July 1402 with the Battle of Ankara, during which Muhammad Sultan led the main body of the army. The Ottoman forces were decisively defeated, with Bayezid himself being taken captive soon after. Immediately following the battle, the prince was dispatched to the Ottoman capital of Bursa to seize Bayezid's treasury. However, he was narrowly beaten there by the Ottoman prince Süleyman Çelebi, who removed many of the city's greatest treasures. What remained was plundered by the Timurid army, including the gold and enamel inlaid bronze gates, which were later presented to Timur's empress, Saray Mulk Khanum. After the pillaging concluded, Muhammad Sultan had the city torched.

Death and burial

Muhammad Sultan was ordered to march back through Ankara to re-join the main army at Kayseri. However, during this journey the prince, already suffering from injuries sustained during the recent battle, fell seriously ill. He died on 12 March 1403, near the city of Afyonkarahisar. Timur bitterly grieved his grandson's passing and ordered the entire army wear dark clothing in mourning. A two hundred horse procession accompanied Muhammad Sultan's body to the fortress of Avnik. From there, he was taken to be temporarily buried in the mazar of Qedar, near the city of Soltaniyeh.

On the anniversary of his death the following year, Muhammad Sultan's remains, accompanied by his mother, were taken for reburial in Samarqand. He was interred in a vault that bore his name, the Khangah-i Muhammad Sultan, part of an existing complex of religious buildings previously erected by the prince. Upon his own death in 1405, Timur was buried there alongside his grandson. Finally, both bodies were moved once more to their present resting-place in the Gur-i-Amir, likely around 1409 by Timur's successor Shah Rukh. The tomb, originally intended for Muhammad Sultan alone, became the Timurid dynastic mausoleum.

Family

Wives and concubines
Khanika: daughter of Muhammad II, Khan of the Chagatai Khanate
Tatali Bi: daughter of Musake Nukuz
Khand Sultan: daughter of Ali Beg Jauni Qurban Oirot
Mihr Agha Hazare
Daulat Sultan
Janibeg
La'l Chicak

Issue
By Khanika
Yahya (b. 1400): married Payanda Sultan Agha, daughter of  Shah Rukh
Aka Biki (d. 1419): married Ulugh Beg
Habiba Sultan, Khanzada Begum (b. 1412)

By Tatali Bi
Sa'd-i Waqqas (1399 – 1417/18): married Rajab Sultan, daughter of Miran Shah
Isiye Biki

By Khand Sultan
Nuh

By Mihr Agha Hazare
Muhammad Jahangir (1396 – 1433): briefly made a puppet-Chagatai Khan by Khalil Sultan, married Maryam Sultan Agha, daughter of Shah Rukh
Muhammad Sultan II (1416 – 1438)
Muhammad Khalil
Aziz Sultan
A'isha Biki: married first Yusuf Dughlat, married second Sayyidi Ahmad, son of Miran Shah. Had one child by her second marriage
Sultan Ahmad

By Daulat Sultan
Shad Malik
Fatima Sultan

By Janibeg
Sivindik Sultan

By La'l Chicak
Isma'il

References

Bibliography

Timurid dynasty
1375 births
1403 deaths